Rognes may refer to:

People
John Rognes (mathematician) (born 1966), Norwegian mathematician
Marie Rognes (born 1982), Norwegian mathematician
John Rognes (army officer) (1902-1949), a Norwegian military officer and Milorg pioneer

Places
Rognes, Bouches-du-Rhône, a commune in the Bouches-du-Rhône department in southern France
Rognes, Norway, a village in Midtre Gauldal municipality in Trøndelag, Norway